Meissa , designated Lambda Orionis (λ Orionis, abbreviated Lambda Ori, λ Ori) is a star in the constellation of Orion. The main components are an O8 giant star and a B-class main sequence star, separated by about 4″. Despite Meissa being more luminous and only slightly further away than Rigel, it appears 3 magnitudes dimmer at visual wavelengths, with much of its radiation emitted in the ultraviolet due to its high temperature.

Nomenclature

Lambda Orionis is the star's Bayer designation. The traditional name Meissa derives from the Arabic Al-Maisan which means 'The Shining One'. Al-Maisan was originally used for Gamma Geminorum, but was mistakenly applied to Lambda Orionis and the name stuck. In 2016, the International Astronomical Union organized a Working Group on Star Names (WGSN) to catalog and standardize proper names for stars. The WGSN's first bulletin of July 2016 included a table of the first two batches of names approved by the WGSN; which included Meissa for this star. It is now so entered in the IAU Catalog of Star Names.

The original Arabic name for this star, Al Hakah (the source for another name for it, Heka) refers to the Arabic lunar mansion that includes this star and the two of Phi Orionis (Al Haḳʽah, 'a White Spot').

Properties
Meissa is a giant star with a stellar classification of O8 III and an apparent visible magnitude 3.54. It is an enormous star with about 26-28 times the mass of the Sun and 10-13  times the Sun's radius. The outer atmosphere has an effective temperature of around 35,000 K,  giving it the characteristic blue glow of a hot O-type star. Meissa is a soft X-ray source with a luminosity of 1032 erg s−1 and peak emission in the energy range of 0.2–0.3 keV, which suggests the X-rays are probably being generated by the stellar wind.

Meissa is actually a double star with a companion at an angular separation of 4.41 arcseconds along a position angle of 43.12° (as of 1937). This fainter component is of magnitude 5.61 and it has a stellar classification of B0 V, making it a B-type main sequence star. There is an outlying component, Meissa C, which is an F-type main sequence star with a classification of F8 V. This star in turn may have a very low mass companion that is probably a brown dwarf.

Ring

Meissa is surrounded by a ring of nebulosity about 12 degrees across. It is thought to be the remains of a supernova explosion, now ionized by the ultraviolet radiation from Meissa itself and some of the surrounding hot stars.

Cluster
This star is the dominant member of a 5-million-year-old star-forming region known as the λ Orionis cluster, or Collinder 69. The intense ultraviolet energy being radiated by this star is creating the Sh2-264 H II region in the neighboring volume of space, which in turn is surrounded by an expanding ring of cool gas that has an age of about 2–6 million years. The expansion of this gaseous ring may be explained by a former binary companion of Meissa that became a Type II supernova. Such an event would also explain the star's peculiar velocity with respect to the center of the expanding ring, as the explosion and resulting mass loss could have kicked Meissa out of the system. A potential candidate for the supernova remnant is the neutron star Geminga. However, the last is unlikely given the distance between Geminga and the cluster.

References

Orionis, Lambda
Orionis, 39
Orion molecular cloud complex
O-type giants
B-type main-sequence stars
Binary stars
036861
026207
Orion (constellation)
Stars named from the Arabic language
Emission-line stars
1879
BD+09 0879